The history of Islam in Iraq goes back almost 1,400 years to the lifetime of Muhammad (died in 632). Iraq's Muslims follow two distinct traditions, Shia Islam (majority) and Sunni Islam (minority).

Religious cities 

Iraq is home to many religious cities important for both Shia and Sunni Muslims. Baghdad was a hub of Islamic learning and scholarship for centuries and served as the capital of the Abbasids. Baghdad also is home to two prominent Shia Imams in what is known as Kadhimiya, Iraq. The city of Karbala has substantial prominence in Shia Islam as a result of the Battle of Karbala, fought in 10 October 680. Similarly, Najaf is renowned as the site of the tomb of Alī ibn Abī Tālib (also known as "Imām Alī"), whom the Shia consider to be the righteous caliph and first imām. The city is now a great center of pilgrimage from throughout the Shi'a Islamic world and it is estimated that only Mecca and Medina receive more Muslim pilgrims.  The city of Kufa was home to the famed scholar Abu Hanifah, whose school of thought is followed by many Sunni Muslims internationally. Kufa was also the capital of the Rashidun Caliphate during the time of Ali. Likewise, Samarra is also home to the al-Askari Mosque, containing the mausoleums of the Ali al-Hadi and Hasan al-Askari, the tenth and eleventh Shia Imams respectively, as well as the maqam (or "point") of Muhammad al-Mahdi, who is the twelfth and final Imam of the Shia Madhhab. This has made it an important pilgrimage centre for Ja'farī Shia Muslims. In addition, some female relatives of Muhammad are buried in Samarra, making the city one of the most significant sites of worship for Shia Muslims and a venerated location for Sunni Muslims. Iraq was also the place of many the fitnas (schisms) that occurred in the beginning.

Demographics 
The data on the religious affiliation of Iraq's population are uncertain. 95–99% of the population are Muslims. The CIA World Factbook reports a 2015 estimate according to which 29–34% are Sunni Muslims and 61-64% Shia Muslims. According to a 2011 survey by Pew Research, 51% of the Muslims identify as Shia and 42% as Sunni.

Gallery

See also 

 Demographics of Iraq
 Religion in Iraq
 List of mosques in Baghdad

References 

 
Iraq